Semanotus juniperi is a species of beetle in the Callidiini subfamily. It was described by Fisher in 1915 and is endemic to Santa Catalina Mountains, Arizona.

References

Callidiini
Beetles described in 1915
Endemic fauna of the United States